The Old Beta Theta Pi Fraternity House is a historic building in Eugene, Oregon, United States. It is an American Foursquare in the American Craftsman (or American Craftsman Bungalow) style, showing considerable Prairie School influence. It was built in 1906-1907 by John B. Kronebusch, for between six and seven thousand dollars. Kronebusch leased it to the Beta Theta Pi fraternity for 15 years. It was then purchased by the Delta Zeta sorority, who occupied the house for six years from 1923 to 1929. A two-story addition was constructed in the mid-1930s, of materials compatible with the original house. In 1936, the upper two levels were turned into apartments separate from the first level and were given their own address of 1176 Mill Street. The exterior and all of the apartments retain a high degree of integrity, with minor modifications made mostly before 1937. It was added to the National Register of Historic Places in 1989.

Notes and references

External links

, National Register Nomination Form
Historic images of the Old Beta Theta Pi Fraternity House from the University of Oregon Libraries digital collections

Houses completed in 1906
Houses on the National Register of Historic Places in Eugene, Oregon
Delta Zeta
Beta Theta Pi
American Foursquare architecture in Oregon
American Craftsman architecture in Oregon
1906 establishments in Oregon
Fraternity and sorority houses